The Chaotic Wrestling (CW) Heavyweight Championship is a professional wrestling championship in Chaotic Wrestling. The current champion is The Mecca, who is in his first reign.

Title history
Jay Jaillet was the inaugural champion. Chase Del Monte's third reign is the longest at 517 days, while Sean Burke's second reign is the shortest at less than a day. Brian Milonas, Chase Del Monte, J. T. Dunn and Handsome Johnny holds the record for having the most reigns at three.

The Mecca is the current champion in his first reign. He defeated Anthony Greene, Brad Cashew and champion Davienne in a four-way elimination match on December 16, 2022 at Dead End in Tewksbury, MA.

Combined reigns 

See also
Chaotic Wrestling New England Championship
Chaotic Wrestling Tag Team Championship
Chaotic Wrestling Pan Optic Championship

References

External links
 Chaotic Wrestling Heavyweight Title History at Cagematch.net

Chaotic Wrestling championships
Heavyweight wrestling championships